Institute of Diplomacy and International Studies, also known as IDIS, is a faculty of Rangsit University, located in Bangkok, Thailand. Established in September 2006, IDIS offers master's program in diplomatic studies.

History

To meet the challenges of globalization and the increasing demand for world-class professionals in international affairs in Thailand and the Asian region, Dr Arthit Ourairat, President of the Rangsit University, decided in early 2006 to establish an institute in the field of diplomatic studies. The Rangist University Council formally approved its establishment on 22 March 2006 and thus Institute of Diplomacy and International Studies (IDIS), came into existence with its multi-disciplinary approach, becoming the first institute of its kind in Southeast Asia.

The establishment of IDIS is an important step in the implementation of Rangsit University’s Road Map to Excellence strategy.

Vision 

Produce professionals for positions of leadership and influence in foreign affairs and international business.

Mission 

To prepare specialized professionals for positions of leadership and influence in diplomacy and foreign affairs. Having acquired knowledge and skills from internationalized standard program, the graduates will be able to perform their services professionally.

Philosophy / Motto

Philosophy: Ethical Diplomacy for International Benefits
 
Motto: ′′To prepare professionals equipped with world class knowledge and skills in diplomacy and foreign affairs′′

Objective

The establishment of Institute of Diplomacy and International Studies aspires to:

 Produce professionals for positions of leadership and influence in diplomacy and international business.
 Promote international cooperation, in particular among Asian countries.
 Foster networking among its alumni, professionals and scholars in international affairs.
 Pursue deep understanding of international issues and concerns through advanced learning and scholarly research.
 Promote foreign language learning.
 Provide both academic and practical skills in the field of negotiation techniques, diplomatic practices, rhetoric, media skills for established diplomats and officials at the  early to mid-career level.
 Provide academic and practical skills to business executives in the field of negotiation techniques, international practices and norms in communicating with foreign business, rhetoric, media skills to help bring Thai businesses into international markets.
 Promote Thailand as a hub of diplomatic and international studies in the Southeast Asian region

Degree Offered

The Institute of Diplomacy and International Studies offers the Master of Arts Program in Diplomacy and International Studies. The Program takes two academic years for completion. Each academic year will be divided into two semester. The first semester begins in August and ends in December. The second semester runs from January to April.

Administration 
Since the founding of the Institute of Diplomacy and International Studies in 2006, Dr. Somkiati Ariyapruchya has served as Dean of the institute.

Ambassador Sompong Sanguanbun (Dean)

Associate Professor Dr. Narong Sinsawasdi (Associate Dean for Academic Affairs and Head of Department)

Mr. Vudhisit Viryasiri (Associate Dean)

Mr. Jiraroj Mamadkul (Assistant Dean)

Faculty and Visiting Professors 

Dr. Somkiati Ariyapruchya
Dr. Darmp Sukontasap 
Dr. Tanasak Wahawisan
Mr. Vudhisit Viryasiri 
Mr. Jiraroj Mamadkul
Dr. Kanyarat Bhantumnavin
Dr. Kiatipong Ariyapruchya
Mr. Kitti Patpongpibul 		
Dr. Paisan Rupanichkij
Dr. Prapat Thepchatree
Dr. Somjai Phagaphasvivat
Dr. Suchati Chutasmit 	
Dr. Suthiphand Chirathivat
Dr. Daniel H. Unger
Dr. Visoot Tuvayanond 	
Mr. Wanchai Roujanavong 
Dr. Narong Sinsawasdi
Mr. Larry Jagan
Mr. Sahawarat Polahan

References
IDIS Webpage

External links 
Rangsit University
Institute of Diplomacy and International Studies

Schools of international relations
Rangsit University
University departments in Thailand